The Flavour and Fragrance Journal is a bimonthly peer-reviewed scientific journal published since 1985 by John Wiley & Sons. It publishes original research articles, reviews and special reports on all aspects of flavour and fragrance. The current Editor-in-Chief is Kerstin Steiner (Firmenich, Switzerland).

Abstracting and indexing 
Flavour and Fragrance Journal is indexed in:

 Chemical Abstracts Service
 Scopus
 Web of Science

According to the Journal Citation Reports, the journal has a 2020 impact factor of 2.576, ranking it 34th out of 74 journals in the category "Applied Chemistry" and 79th out of 144 in the category "Food Science and Technology.

Notable papers 
The most-cited articles published in the  Flavour and Fragrance journal are:

References

External links 
 

Chemistry journals
Wiley (publisher) academic journals
Publications established in 1985
English-language journals